"Hey Bobby" is a song written and recorded by American country music artist K. T. Oslin.  It was released in February 1989 as the third single from the album This Woman.  The song reached #2 on the Billboard Hot Country Singles & Tracks chart.

Chart performance

Year-end charts

References

1989 singles
K. T. Oslin songs
Song recordings produced by Harold Shedd
RCA Records Nashville singles
Songs written by K. T. Oslin
1988 songs